Egypt competed at the 2022 Mediterranean Games held in Oran, Algeria from 25 June to 6 July 2022.

Medalists

| width="78%" align="left" valign="top" |

Archery

Egypt competed in archery.

Artistic gymnastics

Egypt competed in artistic gymnastics.

Athletics

Egypt won five medals in athletics.

Badminton

Egypt competed in badminton.

Boxing

Egypt won three medals in boxing.

Equestrian

Egypt won two medals in equestrian.

Fencing

Egypt won three medals in fencing.

Handball

Egypt won one medal in handball.

Judo

Egypt competed in judo.

Karate

Egypt won seven medals in karate.

Men

Women

Shooting

Egypt won one bronze medal in shooting.

Table tennis

Egypt won two medals in table tennis.

Taekwondo

Egypt won four medals in Taekwondo.

Tennis

Egypt competed in tennis.

Volleyball

Egypt competed in volleyball.

Weightlifting

Egypt won ten medals in weightlifting.

Men

Women

Wrestling

Egypt won nine medals in wrestling.

References

Nations at the 2022 Mediterranean Games
2022
Mediterranean Games